Alicia Wilson (born 5 March 2000) is a British swimmer. She competed in the women's 100 metre backstroke event at the 2020 European Aquatics Championships, in Budapest, Hungary.

Wilson was named as a member of the British team to go to the postponed 2020 Olympics in April 2021. This would be her first Olympics where she would join an "exceptionally high quality team" including more experienced Olympians. She got through the heats and semi finals to make the Olympic final in the 200m Individual Medley.

References

External links
 

2000 births
Living people
British female swimmers
British female backstroke swimmers
Sportspeople from Guildford
Universiade medalists in swimming
Universiade gold medalists for Great Britain
Medalists at the 2019 Summer Universiade
Swimmers at the 2020 Summer Olympics
Olympic swimmers of Great Britain
California Golden Bears women's swimmers
Swimmers at the 2022 Commonwealth Games
Commonwealth Games medallists in swimming
Commonwealth Games bronze medallists for England
21st-century British women
Medallists at the 2022 Commonwealth Games